Divakarla Venkatavadhani (23 June 1911 – 21 October 1986) He was also a Telugu scholar. He created a stage-worthy literary feature called Bhuvana Vijayam, a replay of a poetic tribute-cum-symposium in Krishnadevaraya's court, by Ashta diggajas.

Life
Divakarla was the first poet to stage Bhuvanavijayam in Hyderabad for the first time, playing the role of Allasani Peddana in the play. Tirumala Tirupathi Devasthanam (TTD) published the sacred texts into Telugu in 1984 under Acharya Diwakarla Venkatavadhani as the chief editor. A forum called as Divakarla Vedika was formed to showcase his works.

Works
He contributed to the work of translating Andhra Mahabharatam written in archaic Telugu into the current Telugu. This project was headed by Tirumala Tirupati Devasthanams.

References

1911 births
1986 deaths
20th-century Indian poets
Telugu people
Telugu poets
Indian male poets
Poets from Andhra Pradesh
20th-century Indian male writers
People from West Godavari district